Daniel Gustavsson (born 29 August 1990) is a Swedish footballer who plays for Örebro.

Career
Gustavsson is a midfielder who playing during his AIK career on loan in the 2009 season time with FC Väsby United and Västerås SK.

On 10 December 2013, Gustavsson signed a three-year contract with Örebro which made his move to the club permanently.

In January 2019, Gustavsson moved to Lillestrøm in Norway.

On 5 January 2022, Gustavsson returned to Örebro on a two-year contract with an option for third year.

Honours

AIK 
 Allsvenskan: 2009
 Svenska Cupen: 2009

References

External links 
 

1990 births
People from Kungsör Municipality
Living people
Swedish footballers
Sweden youth international footballers
Association football wingers
Västerås SK Fotboll players
AFC Eskilstuna players
AIK Fotboll players
Örebro SK players
IF Elfsborg players
Lillestrøm SK players
Ettan Fotboll players
Superettan players
Allsvenskan players
Eliteserien players
Norwegian First Division players
Swedish expatriate footballers
Expatriate footballers in Norway
Swedish expatriate sportspeople in Norway
Sportspeople from Västmanland County